Mr Percival (1976 – 2 September 2009) was an Australian pelican, noted for his appearance in the 1976 Australian film Storm Boy. He was one of three trained pelicans used in the film, based on the 1964 novel of the same name. He lived at the Marineland aquarium at West Beach until it closed in 1988, then at the Adelaide Zoo. Mr Percival, whose zoo name was Gringo, fathered seven chicks with partner Alto, the last in 2007. He died of old age on 2 September 2009.

See also
 List of individual birds

References

1976 animal births
2009 animal deaths
Individual pelicans
Individual animals in Australia
Animal actors